The 2022–23 Tulane Green Wave women's basketball team will represent Tulane University during the 2022–23 NCAA Division I women's basketball season. The Green Wave, led by twenty-ninth year head coach Lisa Stockton, play their home games at Devlin Fieldhouse and are ninth year members of the American Athletic Conference.

Previous season 
The Green Wave finished the 2021–22 season 21–10, 11–5 in AAC play to finish in third place. They lost in the quarterfinals of the American Athletic Conference women's tournament to Houston. They received at-large bid to the WNIT where defeated Jacksonville State in the first round before losing to Alabama in the second round.

Offseason

Departures
Due to COVID-19 disruptions throughout NCAA sports in 2020–21, the NCAA announced that the 2020–21 season would not count against the athletic eligibility of any individual involved in an NCAA winter sport, including women's basketball. This meant that all seniors in 2020–21 had the option to return for 2021–22.

Incoming transfers

Recruiting
There were no recruiting classing class of 2022.

Media
All Green Wave games will be broadcast on WRBH 88.3 FM. A video stream for all home games will be on Tulane All-Access, ESPN3, or AAC Digital. Road games will typically be streamed on the opponents website, though conference road games could also appear on ESPN3 or AAC Digital.

Roster

Schedule and results

|-
!colspan=9 style=| Exhibition

|-
!colspan=9 style=| Non-conference regular season

|-
!colspan=9 style=| AAC regular season

|-
!colspan=9 style=| AAC Women's Tournament

Rankings

See also
 2022–23 Tulane Green Wave men's basketball team

References

Tulane
Tulane Green Wave women's basketball seasons
Tulane
Tulane